Haithem Al-Matroushi (Arabic:هيثم المطروشي) (born 1 October 1988) is an Emirati footballer. He currently plays for Al Bataeh .

External links

References

Emirati footballers
1988 births
Living people
Emirates Club players
Fujairah FC players
Al Urooba Club players
Al Bataeh Club players
UAE First Division League players
UAE Pro League players
Association football wingers